Viduklė is a small town in a Raseiniai district municipality, Kaunas County, central-western Lithuania. In 2011, it had a population of 1,678.

History
221 Jews lived in the town according to the 1923 census.
The German army entered the town on June 23, 1941 and set up a ghetto to imprison the Jewish population. Starting on July 24, 1941, hundred of Jews living in the city were shot by Germans and Lithuanians collaborators.

References

This article was initially translated from the Lithuanian Wikipedia.

Towns in Lithuania
Towns in Kaunas County
Duchy of Samogitia
Rossiyensky Uyezd
Holocaust locations in Lithuania
Raseiniai District Municipality